Ivo Zbožínek (born 24 May 1977) is a retired Czech football player.

Zbožínek started his football career in Prostějov. He first played in the Gambrinus liga at Chmel Blšany. He eventually appeared in several other clubs from South Moravia. In 2006, he was transferred to Tescoma Zlín, where he played until 2011.

References

Czech footballers
1977 births
Living people
Czech First League players
FK Chmel Blšany players
1. FC Slovácko players
FC Fastav Zlín players
FK Drnovice players
FC Zbrojovka Brno players
Association football defenders
FC Vysočina Jihlava players
Sportspeople from Prostějov
1. SK Prostějov players